Chub Tarash Mian Golal (also Romanized as Chūb Tarāsh Mīān Golāl; also known as Mīāngelāl-e Chūb Tarāsh and Chūb Tarāsh) is a village in Koregah-e Gharbi Rural District, in the Central District of Khorramabad County, Lorestan Province, Iran. At the 2006 census, its population was 1,418, in 271 families.

References 

Towns and villages in Khorramabad County